The 1930–31 Irish Cup was the 51st edition of the premier knock-out cup competition in Northern Irish football. 

In a repeat of the previous season's final, Linfield won the tournament for the 17th time, defeating Ballymena 3–0 in the final at The Oval.

Results

First round

|}

Quarter-final

|}

Replay

|}

Semi-finals

|}

Final

References

External links
 Northern Ireland Cup Finals. Rec.Sport.Soccer Statistics Foundation (RSSSF)

Irish Cup seasons
1930–31 domestic association football cups
1930–31 in Northern Ireland association football